2 Stepz Ahead is the second album by Oxide & Neutrino, released on 30 September 2002. The album features two top 20 singles and peaked at #28 on the UK albums chart. The song "Shoot 2 Kill" was prominently featured in the film Ali G Indahouse and also appeared on the soundtrack.

Track listing
"Intro"
"Return of Da Supa" (featuring Face)
"Dem Girlz (I Don't Know Why)" (featuring Kowdean)
"Rap Dis (U Can't Stop Dis Shit)" (featuring Swiss, Skat D, Kaish and Harvey)
"Hands Up"
"Supa Sensi" (featuring Sniper)
"They Think It's Easy" (featuring Sef)
"War"
"Amsterdam"
"Sir Pimpalot (featuring Skat D)
"Shoot 2 Kill"
"Rap Dis 2 (featuring Kaish, Swiss and Thug Angel)
"Hard 2 Get" (featuring The Twins)
"Garage Beat"
"Party On" (featuring AC Burrell)
"Roadz Crazy"
"Payback"
"J99"

Chart positions

Album

Singles

Certifications

References

2002 albums
East West Records albums
Oxide & Neutrino albums